Anthony Lukeman (March 24, 1933 – November 11, 2020) was a lieutenant general in the United States Marine Corps who served as Deputy Assistant Secretary of Defense (Military Manpower and Personnel Policy). He is the father of MajGen James W. Lukeman, USMC (ret).

Early life and education
Lt. Gen. Anthony Lukeman, USMC (Ret), 87, of Gainesville, died November 11, 2020. He was born March 24, 1933, in Jamaica, New York, to the late Gerald Lukeman and Marjorie Rice Lukeman. He received a Bachelor of Arts degree from Dartmouth College in 1954, and a master's degree from The George Washington University.

Military career
He served on active duty in the Marine Corps for 35 years, and as then as executive director of the Marine Corps Association for 10 years. He served his country with honor and distinction, including two tours in Vietnam, as a proud Marine. During his career he served in the three active Marine Divisions and commanded infantry organizations at the platoon, company, battalion and regimental levels. During his second tour in Vietnam in 1974-75 he participated in planning and executing the evacuation of U.S. and Vietnamese citizens from Saigon in 1975. He retired as a U.S. Marine Corps Lieutenant General.

Awards and decorations
   Bronze Star w/Combat V

References

External links

 USMCCCA Website .

1933 births
2020 deaths
United States Marine Corps generals
United States Marine Corps officers